Laxe is a northwestern municipality of Spain in the province of A Coruña, in the autonomous community of Galicia. It belongs to the comarca of Bergantiños. It is situated in the sheltered Cabanas bay area, meaning that Laxe's expansive sandy beaches are well-sheltered from Atlantic winds.

Laxe's average temperatures vary greatly, with an average winter-time high of 10-12 celsius, compared to highs of 31-33 celsius in June–July.

Demography 
From:INE Archiv

Notable people
 Juana Teresa Juega López (1885-1979), poet
 Anxo Mato commonly known as Anxo, is a Spanish footballer who plays for CF Villanovense as a winger.

References

Municipalities in the Province of A Coruña